Samuel Alan Harper (born November 9, 1957) was an American politician. He served as a member of the Alabama House of Representatives from the 61st District, from 2006 to 2018. He is a member of the Republican Party, having swapped from the Democrats in 2012.

References

Living people
Republican Party members of the Alabama House of Representatives
1957 births
People from Tuscaloosa County, Alabama
21st-century American politicians
Democratic Party members of the Alabama House of Representatives